This is a list of diplomatic missions in Tanzania. At present, 61 nations maintain diplomatic missions to Tanzania in Dar es Salaam, the former capital and the nation's largest city. Dodoma is the capital city.

Many other countries have ambassadors accredited to Tanzania, with most being resident in Nairobi or Addis Ababa. The Ministry of Foreign Affairs maintains the official consular list. This listing excludes honorary consulates.

Diplomatic missions

Embassies and High Commissions in Dar es Salaam 
Entries marked with an asterisk (*) are member-states of the Commonwealth of Nations. As such, their embassies are formally termed as "high commissions".

*

 (closing in 2024)

*

*

*

*
*

*

*

*

 

*

*

*

Offices in Dodoma 
In July 2018, each of the resident diplomatic missions was offered 5.5 acres of land in the new capital in order to encourage relocation. By February 2021, only ten countries had collected the title deeds. Some diplomats estimate it may take over a decade for them to relocate.

In January 2023, President Samia Suluhu Hassan appealed to the diplomatic community to benefit from the incentives that the government was offering before it expires. Both the Holy See and Uganda have plans to relocate to Dodoma. 

 (Liaison office)
 (Liaison office)
 (Liaison office)

Gallery

Consulates General

Arusha 
 (Liaison office)

Kigoma

Zanzibar City

Non-Resident Embassies/High Commissions 
Resident in Addis Ababa, Ethiopia:

 
 

 

 
 

Resident in Nairobi, Kenya:

 

Resident in Pretoria, South Africa:

 

 

Resident elsewhere:

 (Cairo)
 (Khartoum)
 (Lusaka)
 (Muscat)
 (Geneva)
 (New Delhi)
 (New Delhi)
 (Valletta)
 (Cairo)
 (Maputo)
  (Singapore) 
 (Riyadh)
 (Riyadh)

Closed missions

See also 
 Foreign relations of Tanzania
 List of diplomatic missions of Tanzania

References

External links 
 Embassies in Tanzania

List
Tanzania
Diplomatic missions